Guatemala competed in the 2015 Pan American Games in Toronto, Ontario, Canada from July 10 to 26, 2015.

Race walker Mirna Ortiz was the flagbearer of the country at the opening ceremony.

Competitors
The following table lists Guatemala's delegation per sport and gender.

Medalists

The following competitors from Guatemala won medals at the games. In the by discipline sections below, medalists' names are bolded.

|style="text-align:left; width:78%; vertical-align:top;"|

|style="text-align:left; width:22%; vertical-align:top;"|

Archery

Guatemala qualified two male archers based on its performance at the 2014 Pan American Championships. Later Guatemala qualified 1 woman based on its performance at the 2015 Copa Merengue.

Athletics

Guatemala qualified seven athletes (six men and one woman).

Men

Women

Badminton

Guatemala has qualified a full team of eight athletes (four men and four women).

Men

Women

Mixed

Beach volleyball

Guatemala has qualified a men's and women's pair for a total of four athletes.

Boxing

Guatemala qualified five male boxers.

Men

Bowling

Canoeing

Sprint
Guatemala has received one wildcard in men's kayak.

Men

Qualification Legend: QF = Qualify to final; QS = Qualify to semifinal

Cycling

Guatemala has qualified nine cyclists (three men and six women). Some of the athletes will compete in multiple disciplines.

Road
Six cyclists competed for Guatemala in the road competitions.

Men

Women

Track

Mountain biking
Guatemala entered one male mountain biker.

Men

Equestrian

Fencing

Guatemala has qualified one male fencer.

Men

Golf

Guatemala qualified a full team of four golfers.

Gymnastics

Artistic
Guatemala qualified 2 gymnasts.

Men
Individual Qualification

Individual Finals

Qualification Legend: Q = Qualified to apparatus final

Women
Individual Qualification

Individual Finals

Qualification Legend: Q = Qualified to apparatus final

Judo

Guatemala has qualified a team of three female judokas.

Women

Modern pentathlon

Guatemala has qualified a team of 5 athletes (2 men and 3 women).

Racquetball

Guatemala qualified a team of two men and two women for a total of four athletes.

Singles and Doubles 

Team

Roller sports

Guatemala has qualified two athletes (one male and one female) in the speed competitions.

Speed

Rowing

Guatemala has qualified 4 boats.

Qualification Legend: FA=Final A (medal); FB=Final B (non-medal); R=Repechage

Sailing

Guatemala qualified 4 boats (five athletes).

Squash

Guatemala has qualified a full team of six athletes (three men and three women).

Singles and Doubles 

Team

Shooting

Guatemala qualified 21 shooters (14 male and 7 female).

Men

Women

Swimming

Guatemala qualified eight swimmers (three men and five women).

Men

*Note: Peruvian swimmer Mauricio Fiol was suspended by his team and pulled from the A final of the 100 meter butterfly for testing positive for stanozolol. Therefore, Luis Martinez was able to swim in the A final.

Women

Synchronized swimming

Guatemala qualified a duet. The team originally did not qualify, but after Puerto Rico declined its quota earned at the 2014 Central American and Caribbean Games in Veracruz, Mexico, the country was allowed to enter a duet as the first reserve. The duet ended up finishing in last place.

Table tennis

Guatemala has qualified a men's and women's team.

Men

Women

Taekwondo

Guatemala has qualified a team of five athletes (three men and two women).

Tennis

Guatemala qualified three tennis players (two men and one woman).

Triathlon

Guatemala qualified three triathletes players (one man and two women).

Water skiing

Guatemala received a reallocated quota spot in the water skiing competitions.

Men

Weightlifting

Guatemala qualified a team of 4 athletes (2 men and 2 women). Guatemala's fourth athlete (Astrid Camposeco) tested positive for doping on May 23 (but results were determined only on July 9 when she was in Toronto and was disqualified before the games started. She was scheduled to compete in the women's +75 kg category.

Wrestling

Guatemala qualified one male athlete.

Men's freestyle

See also
Guatemala at the 2016 Summer Olympics

References

Nations at the 2015 Pan American Games
P
2015